is a 1962 Japanese color crime thriller film directed by Kinji Fukasaku starring Kōji Tsuruta, Shinichi Chiba, and Tetsurō Tamba. In an interview with Chris Desjardins contained in the book Outlaw Masters of Japanese Film, Fukasaku called the film "the story of an ex-yakuza who becomes an undercover policeman."

Plot
Unable to make and headway in a case, Detective Ogawa asks former yakuza member Ryoji Tojima to go undercover to obtain more information. This would mean pretending to return to the yakuza in order to investigate the former yakuza Tatsumura, who now presents himself as a legitimate businessman but is suspected to still be involved in crime. Tojima is reluctant to return to the world of the yakuza at first but ends up agreeing after his friend is beaten. His nephew Osamu is eager to join in but Tojima refuses his help. Tojima assembles a crew with criminal backgrounds and special skills to take on the job. Together they investigate several clubs and bars owned by Tatsumura to determine if he has undeclared sources of income from crime. Tojima is almost killed outside of one of the clubs but is saved by Masao Kuroki, the younger brother of a man Tojima killed five years earlier, because Kuroki wants kill Tojima himself. Kuroki decides to accompany Tojima during his investigation of Tatsumura in order to protect his intended target. Tojima and his men eventually discover that the establishments owned by Tatsamura are fronts for an illegal moonshine operation at work. Meanwhile, Osamu recklessly takes it upon himself to investigate further and ends up captured by Tatsumura's men, who also kidnap Tojima's wife. Tojima struggles to find a way to take down Tatsumura while also protecting his loved ones.

Cast

 Kōji Tsuruta as Ryoji Tojima
 Tatsuo Umemiya as Masao Kuroki
 Shinichi Chiba as Osamu Kaji
 Yoshiko Sakuma as Akiko Mizuno
 Tetsurō Tamba as Jūgo Tatsumura
 Harumi Sone as Goro Ishihara
 Junkichi Orimoto as Yuichi Noguchi
 Hideo Sunazuka as Mamoru Matsushima
 Tamaki Sawa as Naomi
 Takashi Kanda as Inspector Fujikawa
 Yoshi Katō as Detective Ogata
 Nakajirō Tomita as Takeji Maeda
 Shunji Kasuga as Yoshio Murakami
 Ken Sawaaki as Seiji Shimazu
 Mitsuo Ando as Torahiko Tanimoto
 Nobuo Yana
 Jūshirō Kobayashi as Saichi Sakura
 Isamu Yamaguchi as Suzumoto group boss
 Koji Miemachi
 Akira Kuji
 Akira Katayama as "Castle of the Night" club master
 Genji Kawai
 Satoshi Akiyama

Production
Gang vs. G-Men is the fourth in the Gyangu series of films and the first in the series to be directed by Fukasaku. Fukasaku went on to also direct the seventh film in the series, Gyangu domai (Gang Alliance, a.k.a. League of Gangsters) (1963).

This was the first film shot by Fukasaku in color.

Sequel
The film was followed by a sequel, Gyangu tai G-men: Shudan kinko yaburi, sometimes known in English as Gang vs. G-Men 2, that was released February 23, 1963. The sequel was directed by Teruo Ishii.

Reception, analysis, and legacy
Yukio Mishima, a close friend of Okada, often came to Toei's preview room. He also previewed Gang vs. G-Men and praised it. Years later, when Fukasaku was directing Mishima's play Black Lizard, he said to Mishima, "You praised Gang vs. G-Men, which saved my neck."

The film was a hit, and the company's confidence in Fukasaku, which had been falling, was restored.

In the book Historical Dictionary of Japanese Cinema, author Jasper Sharp writes that, along with Wolves, Pigs and Men and Greed in Broad Daylight, "Gang vs. G-Men (Gyangu tai G-men, 1962), in which a disparate group of former criminals are assembled by the police to take on a vicious gang [ . . . ] established Fukasaku's pattern for contemporary action and crime dramas inspired by the French New Wave and American noir, featuring realistic portrayals of violence and often set in chaotic, working-class milieux."

Kimihiko Kamata of eiganokuni.com wrote, "The all-star movie Gang vs. G-Men, spearheaded by Shigeru Okada himself, the director of Toei Tokyo Studio, is a nostalgic G-Men movie inspired by the American TV drama The Untouchables."

References

External links

Gang vs. G-Men at eiga.com

1962 films
1962 crime films
1960s crime thriller films
Films directed by Kinji Fukasaku
Films set in Tokyo
1960s Japanese films
Japanese crime thriller films
1960s Japanese-language films
Toei Company films
Yakuza films